Yeghishe Arakyal Monastery or Monastery of Yeghishe the Apostle is an Armenian Apostolic Church in Nagorno-Karabakh, located close to the village of Madagiz, on the bank of the Tartar River. The complex comprises the church, seven chapels, a cemetery, and ruins of other buildings.

History 
Yeghishe Arakyal Monastery was built sometime in the 5th century and expanded in the 13th century. One of the seven chapels surrounding the minster is the tomb of Vachagan III, King of Caucasian Albania, also known as Vachagan the Pious (487–510), another contains the grave of Melik-Atam the Great (Melik-Israelian) of Jraberd.

Gallery

See also 
 Armenian culture
 Armenian architecture
 Architecture of Azerbaijan
 Culture of Nagorno-Karabakh
 Bridge of Jerveshtik

References

External links 

 Yeghishe Arakyel Monastery at Armeniapedia.org

Christian monasteries in Azerbaijan
Churches in Azerbaijan
Armenian Apostolic monasteries
Armenian Apostolic monasteries in Azerbaijan
Oriental Orthodox congregations established in the 5th century
Christian monasteries established in the 5th century
Tartar District
Martakert Province